Arturo Gatti (April 15, 1972 – July 11, 2009) was an Italian-Canadian professional boxer who competed from 1991 to 2007. A world champion in two weight classes, Gatti held the IBF junior lightweight title from 1995 to 1998, and the WBC super lightweight title from 2004 to 2005. He also participated in The Ring magazine's Fight of the Year a total of four times (1997, 1998, 2002, and 2003). He announced his retirement on July 14, 2007. After his death in 2009, Gatti was inducted into the International Boxing Hall of Fame on December 10, 2012, in his first year of eligibility, becoming the tenth Canadian boxer to be so inducted.

Gatti was born in Cassino, Italy, and raised in Lazio, a region of central western Italy, before moving to Montreal, Canada. Gatti eventually relocated to Jersey City, New Jersey as a teenager where he found a manager he trusted and decided to turn pro. He returned to Montreal after retiring from boxing to work in real estate.

He died under mysterious circumstances in 2009. His Brazilian wife was arrested for his homicide, then released after an autopsy done in Brazil ruled his death was a suicide. Subsequent American and Quebecois investigations could not agree on Gatti's cause of death, and discovered a history of suicidal ideation.

Professional career 
Arturo Gatti was a member of the Canadian National team, and was training to represent Canada at the 1992 Summer Games, but in 1991, at age 19, he decided to turn pro instead. He began boxing professionally on the night of June 10, 1991, with a third-round knockout of Jose Gonzalez in Secaucus, New Jersey. He went undefeated for six bouts before losing to King Solomon by split decision in six rounds on November 17, 1992.

His next fight, on March 24, 1993, was his first fight abroad, where he visited Amsterdam, Netherlands and knocked out Plawen Goutchev in round one.

In 1994, he beat Leon Bostic, and followed through with a Round 1 knockout over Pete Taliaferro to win the USBA super featherweight title. He retained the title against Richard Salazar and former world champion Jose Sanabria.

Signing with HBO 
On December 15, 1995, Gatti challenged the IBF super featherweight Champion Tracy Harris Patterson, Floyd Patterson's adoptive son. Gatti became world champion when he narrowly outpointed Patterson (scoring: 116–111, 115–112, 114–113) and signed a multi-fight deal with HBO to fight on HBO Boxing.

He only had two fights in 1996, once defending his world title. His title defense, at Madison Square Garden against Dominican Wilson Rodriguez was the first of three Gatti fights in a row to be named a candidate for "Fight of the Year" by Ring Magazine. Dropped in round two and with his right eye closing fast, Gatti knocked Rodriguez down in round five with a left hook to the body, before finishing him off in round six to retain the title.

In 1997, he again won a points victory over Patterson, but this time by a larger margin (118–108, 117–109, 116–110). He then scored a technical knockout over former world champion Calvin Grove in the seventh round of a non-title affair. Then came his defense against former world champion Gabriel Ruelas, which was also named "Fight of the Year" by Ring Magazine. Rocked by a left uppercut in the fourth, Gatti absorbed more than 15 consecutive punches before being saved by the bell. In the fifth, with Ruelas again the aggressor and looking close to victory, Gatti connected with a left hook that lifted Ruelas off the canvas and resulted in the knock out.

To the lightweight division 
After that fight, Gatti relinquished the world title, going up in weight to the lightweight division. However, 1998 was a bad year for Gatti, as he lost all three of his fights that year. He lost by a technical knockout in round eight to Angel Manfredy, and then lost a pair of close 10-round decisions to Ivan Robinson, the first by split decision, the second by unanimous. In Gatti-Robinson II, Gatti had a point deducted in the eighth round for low blows. Had the point not been deducted, the fight would have been a draw, as Robinson was only ahead by one point on two scorecards. Gatti-Robinson I was chosen "Fight of the Year" by Ring Magazine, thus marking the second year in a row that a Gatti fight was given that award and the third year in a row a Gatti fight was nominated.

He only had one fight in 1999, knocking out Reyes Munoz in round one.

Controversial fight against Gamache 
Gatti's first fight of 2000 proved to be controversial. Faced with former world champion Joey Gamache, Gatti won by a knockout in round two. A subsequent lawsuit by Gamache's handlers claimed Gatti had gained 19 pounds since the weigh-in the day before and thus had a large advantage over Gamache. In the wake of the fight, boxing regulators pushed for a new law limiting the amount of weight a competitor can gain between the weigh-in and time of the fight. Gatti was also accused by Gamache's handlers of not having actually made the contracted weight of 141 pounds. After Gatti-Gamache, some boxing commissions started weighing boxers a second time.

Gatti also won his two other fights that year, against Eric Jukabuwski and Joe Hutchinson.

Trilogy against Micky Ward 

In 2001, Gatti only had one fight, going up in weight to meet welterweight Oscar De La Hoya, who beat him by a technical knockout in five rounds. In 2002, Gatti returned to the light welterweight division and defeated former world champion Terronn Millett by a knockout in round four.

He then split two ten-round decisions with "Irish" Micky Ward, losing their first bout, but winning their second. Gatti-Ward I also earned "Fight of the Year" honors by Ring Magazine, and the 9th round was called the Round of the Century by Emanuel Steward.

On June 7, 2003, he and Ward had a rubber match. Gatti broke his twice-repaired right hand when he struck Ward's hip bone with an attempted body shot in the fourth, and he dropped his arm. In the sixth, Gatti dominated the round, but got caught with an overhand to the top of the head a second before the bell rang and went down. Gatti would win the match by unanimous decision. The third fight between the two was again named "Fight of the Year" by Ring Magazine.

Gatti vs Ward I & III are also part of HBO's 10 best fights of the decade.

Career after Micky Ward 
On January 24, 2004, Gatti, having recovered from a broken hand, scored a tenth round knock-down and defeated Gianluca Branco of Italy by a 12-round unanimous decision to win the vacant WBC light welterweight title.

On July 24, 2004, he knocked out the previously unbeaten former world champion Leonard Dorin Doroftei in two rounds at Atlantic City, to retain his title.

Gatti's second defense of his WBC title came against former WBC super featherweight Champion Jesse James Leija on January 29, 2005. Gatti beat Leija by a fifth-round knockout.

In his next fight, Gatti fought former super featherweight and lightweight world champion Floyd Mayweather Jr. on June 25, 2005. He took a horrific beating and Gatti's corner man threw in the towel after he was beaten around the ring, thus ending his title reign via sixth-round technical knockout.

After the loss to Mayweather, Gatti moved up to the welterweight division. He beat Thomas Damgaard on January 28, 2006, by an eleventh-round technical knockout to win the vacant IBA welterweight title and become a champion in 3 different weight divisions.

On July 22, 2006, Gatti lost by a TKO to Carlos Baldomir, vying for the WBC & The Ring welterweight championship. He then broke off his relationship with Buddy McGirt and had a new trainer in Micky Ward.

Final fight and retirement 
Gatti attempted a comeback on July 14, 2007, against Alfonso Gomez, only to get TKO'd by Gomez. After the fight, Gatti announced his retirement in the dressing room, reportedly quipping: "I'm coming back — as a spectator." 

Gatti retired with a record of 40 wins and 9 losses, with 31 wins by knockout. On September 24, 2008, reports had surfaced that Gatti was considering a comeback against Montreal welterweight Antonin Décarie, the Canadian and North American Boxing Organization champion. On December 10, 2012, Arturo Gatti was voted into the International Boxing Hall of Fame.

Fighting style 
Arturo was an aggressive, all-action fighter, often remembered as a slugger. Early on in his career, Gatti showed his tremendous punching power as he amassed a large number of first-round knockouts. Although he had the ability to box many opponents (as shown in the second Micky Ward fight) Gatti would often get into brawls when his opponents were able to take the power and fight back. This is why many of his bouts against good opposition were slug-fests.

Gatti had incredible heart, and a very good chin, shown in the majority of his major fights. He was able to absorb incredible amounts of punishment by fighters such as Wilson Rodriguez, Gabriel Ruelas, Angel Manfredy, Ivan Robinson, Oscar De La Hoya, Micky Ward, Floyd Mayweather and Carlos Baldomir, none of whom could knock him out cold. In the Rodriguez fight he showed off his recuperative abilities as he was close to being stopped under a barrage of shots and in the next round he stopped his opponent.

Oscar De La Hoya, who faced many big punchers from 130 pounds to 160 pounds, says Gatti hit him the hardest out of any fighter.

Death 
On July 11, 2009, Gatti was found dead in a hotel in Ipojuca, Pernambuco, Brazil, where he was on holiday with his Brazilian wife, Amanda Rodrigues, and their 10-month-old son. He was 37 years old. Gatti's wife was initially charged with murder after Brazilian authorities ruled Gatti's death a homicide, but after the coroner's autopsy report was released, they declared it was a suicide, and charges against his widow were dropped. Gatti had a history of suicidal threats and had previously attempted suicide in 2006.  On July 31, 2009, it was announced that the Canadian government would be seeking more information from the Brazilian authorities on Gatti's death. Gatti's family confirmed that there would be a second autopsy done in Quebec.

Two independent investigators hired by Gatti's longtime manager Pat Lynch released a statement in September 2011 that they believed Gatti was murdered. A contributing factor to their conclusion was an injury to the back of Gatti's head that they believed could not have been self inflicted. After receiving the independent investigators' findings, Brazilian authorities again concluded that Gatti died by suicide.

At the family's request, a Quebec coroner agreed to exhume the body so that two pathologists could conduct a second autopsy. After an autopsy, the pathologists ruled there was "no clear evidence of foul play" and expressed doubt at the conclusions reached by the private investigators hired by Gatti's manager.  CBC's The Fifth Estate and HBO's Real Sports with Bryant Gumbel both interviewed witnesses who stated Gatti assaulted his wife in public the night before his death, and that the injuries to the back of his head came as result of Gatti fighting with passerby's who attempted to intervene.

Gatti is interred at Cimetiere de Laval in Laval, Quebec.

In popular culture 
Australian hardcore band Toe to Toe named their 2010 album Arturo Gatti.
Gatti's death in Brazil, on the day of his sister's wedding in Miami, was the subject of the Murder in Paradise episode "Brazilian Knockout", on the Investigation Discovery channel.

Professional boxing record

Pay-per-view bouts

References

Further reading 
Cooley, Will. "'Vanilla Thrillas': Modern Boxing and White-Ethnic Masculinity", Journal of Sport and Social Issues 34:4 (November 2010), 418-437.
Raspanti, John J. and Taylor, Dennis. "Intimate Warfare: The True Story of the Arturo Gatti vs. Micky Ward Boxing Trilogy" [Rowman and Littlefield], (2016.)

External links 

Arturo Gatti Q&A at BoxingInsider

Arturo Gatti profile at About.com
Official website (archived)

1972 births
2009 deaths
2009 suicides
Canadian sportspeople of Italian descent
Canadian expatriate sportspeople in the United States
Canadian male boxers
Boxers from Montreal
Deaths from asphyxiation
Italian emigrants to Canada
Italian male boxers
International Boxing Federation champions
International Boxing Hall of Fame inductees
Naturalized citizens of Canada
People from Cassino
Welterweight boxers
World Boxing Council champions
World light-welterweight boxing champions
World super-featherweight boxing champions
Sportspeople from the Province of Frosinone